Problem Child 3: Junior in Love (known onscreen as simply Problem Child 3) is a 1995 American television film directed by Greg Beeman and written by Michael Hitchcock. It is the third and final installment of the Problem Child trilogy created by Scott Alexander and Larry Karaszewski. The film premiered on NBC on May 13, 1995. It is the only film in the series not to receive a theatrical release.

The film sets off in an entirely different direction from the second film. Junior is a preteen and is infatuated with a girl named Tiffany, but she does not notice him. Things take a mischievous turn when he finds out there are three other boys interested in her as well. In this installment, he is portrayed by Justin Chapman replacing Michael Oliver and Ben is portrayed by William Katt replacing John Ritter. Neither Annie (Amy Yasbeck) nor Trixie (Ivyann Schwan) appear in it, nor are they mentioned. Gilbert Gottfried and Jack Warden are the only cast members to appear in all three films (with Gottfried being the only one appearing in the films and the animated series). Eric Edwards reprises his role as "Murph" from the second film. The film neither explains why Junior is once again wearing a bow-tie, since he discarded it at the end of the first film, nor how Big Ben is still rich, since his apparent new wife, LaWanda Dumore, is never mentioned and how Mr. Peabody went from being a school principal to a dentist.

Plot
Junior Healy tells a story from multiple drawings in a coloring book, and it switches to his classroom where he is told by Miss Hicks that he got an "F" for not finishing his science project, and he mentions that "it's all about sound waves", and the bell rings, causing a set of traps to trigger, and her to fall out a window. The audience is told that Murph, one of his classmates, ratted him out, and the principal called his dad, Ben, prompting him to take him to get help. They meet Sarah Gray, a therapist who tests him, and decides that he needs some activities to do. Junior takes this harshly, and does not approve of these options.

He is taken to a dance school, run by Lila Duvane, a tyrannical debutante, and hates it at first; but then he meets Tiffany, a girl who recently moved to town, but Murph informs him that three boys named Duke Phlim, Blade and Corky McCullum have already laid claim. Junior tries to proclaim his love to Tiffany, but fails miserably. At school, he is given a new teacher, the overbearing Mr. Burtis, who he traps in the same way he did to Miss Hicks. In his victory, Junior bites into an apple and feels pain. He and Ben go to a dentist's office where it is discovered by the infamous Igor Peabody that he needs dental braces. Ben asks his father, Big Ben, for a $5,000 loan, which leads to disappointing results.

After meeting the trio and Tiffany, Junior decides to pursue scouting under Scoutmaster Eugene Phlim, also Duke's father. Afterwards, he decides to enroll in hockey. He gets beaten by Blade's team, prompting him to take part in a Peter Pan play, where Corky is the star and Junior is stuck playing a weed. Ben meets Sarah at Big Ben's, and it is discovered that she was dating Phlim, and subsequently broken up with him. Meanwhile, after Corky rudely mocks Junior about his braces, Junior sneaks on to the horse grounds at Corky's mansion and uses a slingshot on Corky's horse, causing it to rear and hurl Corky into the pool.

When Junior comes back to get his braces tightened, he gets his revenge for his humiliation he received from them by releasing laughing gas that knocks Peabody and his nurse, Kiki, unconscious. They later wake up wearing braces, with her tied to the patient chair and him hanging from the ceiling fan.

Junior begins his plan of getting even with the three boys for bullying him. During the hockey tournament, Junior beats everyone of the opposing team players, and strikes Blade with a puck. After this, Junior is banned for life, and then, in the production of Peter Pan, he traps Corky by distracting the janitor, and pulling the rope attached to the suspension harness and crashing it down, severely injuring Corky and Duvane. Finally, seeking revenge for seeing Sarah, Philm and Duke challenges Ben and Junior to a relay race. Junior sabotages every obstacle on their side, and he and Ben win.

With the three boys seriously injured and terrified of him, Junior finally tries to spend some time with Tiffany, who turns out to be a rich brat. In retaliation, he pranks her by tying the sash ribbon on her dress to a statue, and as she walks forward, it rips off. In her underwear, embarrassed and laughed at, she runs out crying, and Bertha, blaming Junior, chases after her. Junior finds a kinder girl, dressed as a witch and also wearing braces, whereas Ben and Sarah get together.

Cast
 William Katt as Ben Healy
 Justin Chapman as Junior Healy
 Sherman Howard as Scoutmaster Eugene Phlim
 Carolyn Lowery as Sarah Gray
 Eric Edwards as Murph / Bertha
 Jennifer Ogletree as Tiffany
 Blake McIver Ewing as Corky McCullum
 Brock Pierce as Duke Phlim
 Jake Richardson as Blade
 Gilbert Gottfried as Dr. Igor Peabody who is Junior's second archenemy. Mostly he uses three jobs from the trilogy, from running the orphanage, elementary school principal and dentist. 
 Jack Warden as Big Ben Healy who is Junior's wealthy grandfather who treats Junior and his son Ben like dirt and mean. He is Junior's first archenemy. 
 Ellen Albertini Dow as Lila Duvane
 Marianne Muellerleile as Miss Hicks
 Bruce Ed Morrow as Mr. Burtis
 Jacqueline Obradors as Conchita
 Kelli Thacker as Nurse Kiki
 Rance Howard as the Janitor

Availability
Due to the film being a failure, Universal never had intentions to release it on home video or DVD in North America, while it was released on streaming platforms, but it did have a VHS and region 2 DVD release.

External links
 
 

1995 television films
1995 films
1995 comedy films
1990s black comedy films
American black comedy films
American comedy television films
Films about dentistry
Films about adoption
NBC network original films
Television sequel films
Films directed by Greg Beeman
1990s American films